This list of fictional dinosaurs is subsidiary to the list of fictional animals and is a collection of various notable non-avian dinosaur characters that appear in various works of fiction. It is limited to well-referenced examples of dinosaurs and related prehistoric reptiles in literature, film, television, comics, animation, video games and mythology, and applies only to non-avian dinosaur species that lived from the Triassic Period until the end of the Cretaceous.

Literature

Comics

Film and television

Animation

Video games

See also
 List of fictional birds
List of fictional birds of prey
List of fictional ducks
In animation
List of fictional penguins

References

External links
 A list of Dinosaurs in Science Fiction Literature, by Michael Brett-Surman

Dinosaurs
 
Fictional